Oulton Academy (formerly Royds Academy, Royds School), founded in 1956, is a co-educational secondary school located in Leeds, West Yorkshire, England. The school serves approximately 1,300 pupils. Royds School was originally a secondary modern and is now a non-selective school serving Rothwell, south Leeds and the surrounding areas.

The school originally gained Specialist Language College status in 2003. This was removed in 2014.

On 3 November 2010 Royds School was visited by American popstar singer and songwriter Alexis Jordan, performing 'Good Girl' and 'Happiness', as part of a 96.3 Radio Aire campaign for 100% school attendance through November.

Royds School became a Premier UK Rock Challenge school in 2011 after winning the Northern Open Heat and Northern Open Final. Royds maintained this prestigious title until the school was stripped of its premier status in 2014 due to not competing. Royds School qualified to their second Northern Open Final in April 2015 by being the highest scoring runner-up at their open heat. In March 2017, Royds were once again victorious in their Northern Open Heat, qualifying for their third Northern Open Final, on 30 June.

Previously a foundation school administered by Leeds City Council, in April 2021 Royds School converted to academy status and was renamed Royds Academy. The school is now sponsored by the Falcon Education Academies Trust.

In Summer 2021, consultation took place with staff and parents, and it was agreed that Royds Academy would change its name to Oulton Academy in 2022.

References

External links
 

Academies in Leeds
Secondary schools in Leeds
Rothwell, West Yorkshire
Educational institutions established in 1956
1956 establishments in England